Forest Hill is a rural town and locality in the Lockyer Valley Region, Queensland, Australia.

Geography

Forest Hill railway station is an abandoned railway station on the Main Line railway.

There is an aircraft landing ground between Gatton Laidley Road and the railway line.

History

In 1880, AJ Boyd purchased 975 acres (394.6 hectares) of land from the Queensland Government for reportedly five shillings an acre. The land was located approximately six kilometres south from the Main Line railway, towards Woodlands. Boyd named this property Forest Hill, after seeing Allan Cunningham's map of the region where he had marked a "forest hill". A stopping place was established on the Main Line railway to service the property called Boyd's Siding which later changed its name to Forest Hill.

Forest Hill was recorded as a railway station in 1881 and was located one kilometre east down the line from its later location. The railway station moved to its later location in 1886.

The first Forest Hill Post Office opened on 1 February 1890 at the railway station (replacing a receiving office named Forest Hill Siding open since 1889). The office moved to its current site at 40 Victoria Street on 7 January 1908.

Forest Hill Provisional School opened on 23 January 1893, becoming a state school in 1899.

St Thomas's Anglican Church was dedicated on 2 August 1903 by Archdeacon Arthur Evan David. Its closure on 3 May 2005 was approved by Assistant Bishop Rob Nolan.

Forest Hill was once home to five hotels, a hospital, a bakery and butcher, and was the largest rail freight hub for agricultural produce in Queensland.

The Forest Hill War Memorial was erected to commemorate those in the district who had died or served in World War I. It was unveiled by five mothers of deceased soldiers on 26 March 1921.

During the 2010–11 Queensland floods, much of the population of Forest Hill was required to be evacuated by helicopter to nearby Gatton to avoid rapidly rising floodwaters.

Heritage listings

Forest Hill has a number of heritage-listed sites, including:
 15 Church Street: Forest Hill State School
 Gordon Street: Forest Hill War Memorial
 Victoria Street: Lockyer Hotel
 3 Victoria Street: Queensland National Bank
 38 William Street: Forest Hill Hotel

Education 
Forest Hill State School is a government primary (Prep-6) school for boys and girls at Church Street. In 2018, the school had an enrolment of 137 students with 10 teachers (9 full-time equivalent) and 10 non-teaching staff (5 full-time equivalent).

There is no secondary school in Forest Hill. The nearest secondary schools are Laidley State High School in Laidley to the south-east and Lockyer District State High School in Gatton to the west.

Amenities 
Forest Hill Post Office is at 40 Victoria Street. It is also a cafe called Cafe 4342 (the postcode for the area) and gift shop.

Forest Hill's Fire and Rescue Station is at 4 Williams Street beside the railway line.

Forest Hill's State Emergency Service facilities are at 24 Railway Street beside Furley Park.

St Joseph's Catholic Church is at 8-10 Hunt Street.

References

Further reading

External links

 
 

 
Towns in Queensland
Lockyer Valley Region
Localities in Queensland